Smoking in East Timor is highly common, with the country having a high percentage of smokers. An estimate 33% of the population smoke daily, with 61% of East Timorese men who use tobacco products regularly. Although it is required that packaging display warnings, this is rendered largely ineffective by the large amount of East Timorese adults who cannot read. There is very little restriction on Tobacco advertisement and it is common to see teachers and students smoking in school.

A study in 2008 found that stress brought on from poverty and the struggle for independence significantly contributed towards youth smoking. Former President and independence activists Xanana Gusmão is himself a heavy smoker who said that cigarettes helped him and his colleagues stay calm while they were fighting the Indonesians. As with neighboring Indonesia tobacco advertisement is prevalent and cigarettes are cheap, only around 25 cents per pack.

In November 2015 the East Timorese government promised tighter rules governing tobacco consumption.

References

East Timorese culture
Health in East Timor
Timor-Leste